Pepi Sonuga (born Stephanie Sonuga, September 8, 1993), is a Nigerian-American actress and singer. She is best known for roles as Lacey Emery in the Starz horror-comedy series Ash vs Evil Dead (2016) and Tangey Turner in the Freeform drama series Famous in Love (2017–2018).

Life and career
Sonuga was born to a Yoruba father and an Igbo mother in Lagos, Nigeria and moved to Los Angeles, California at age 10. On the transition, Sonuga said, "It was hard to adjust. I didn’t really know much about America, and I obviously had a very thick accent. I found it hard as far as being bullied." At age 15, Sonuga contested and was named Miss Teen Los Angeles. She  also began modeling for brands such as Forever 21, Hot Topic, and Skechers. She attended Culver City High School in Culver City, California.

Filmography

See also 
 List of General Hospital characters
 List of The Fosters characters
 Children of General Hospital
 Evil Dead
 List of 9-1-1 characters

References

1993 births
21st-century African-American people
21st-century American actresses
21st-century Nigerian actresses
Actresses from California
African-American actresses
American beauty pageant contestants
American people of Igbo descent
American television actresses
Living people
Nigerian emigrants to the United States
Nigerian television actresses
American people of Yoruba descent
Igbo actresses
Yoruba actresses
People from Lagos
Igbo beauty pageant contestants
Yoruba beauty pageant contestants
21st-century African-American women
Nigerian models
Residents of Lagos